Villanova is a suburb of Philadelphia, Pennsylvania, United States. It straddles Lower Merion Township in Montgomery County and Radnor Township in Delaware County. It is located at the center of the Philadelphia Main Line, a series of Philadelphia suburbs located along the original east–west railroad tracks of the Pennsylvania Railroad. It is served by the SEPTA Paoli/Thorndale Line regional rail train and the Norristown High Speed Line.

The center of the village straddles U.S. Route 30 (Lancaster Avenue) where it intersects Pennsylvania Route 320 (Spring Mill Road). This village center contains the area's post office for ZIP Code 19085, an office building, the Wilmington Trust Company's Pennsylvania headquarters, and several smaller shops.

History
The Bridge in Radnor Township No. 2 and Camp-Woods are listed on the National Register of Historic Places.

Geography

Climate 
Villanova has a hot-summer humid continental climate (Dfa) and average monthly temperatures range from 30.9 °F in January to 75.6 °F in July. The local hardiness zone is 7a.

Demographics
Villanova is neither an incorporated area nor a census-designated place; all the data is for the ZIP code 19085. As of the census of 2000, there were 9,189 people and 1,932 households residing in the community. The population density was 1,565 people per square mile. The racial makeup of the community was 92.5% White, 3.4% Asian, 3.9% African American, 1.40% from other races, and 0.80% from two or more races. 2.5% of the population were Hispanic or Latino of any race.

The median income for a household in the community was $159,538, and the median income for a family was $174,511. The per capita income for the community was $50,204. About 1.5% of families and 3.0% of the population were below the poverty line. The estimated median house/condo value in 2009 is $1,435,844.

Education

Colleges 
The most notable feature of Villanova is Villanova University, from which the community gains its name. The university campus extends from County Line Road along Spring Mill Road south to Lancaster Pike, US Route 30, and then east to just beyond Villanova Stadium, home of the Villanova University football, men's and women's lacrosse, women's field hockey and men's and women's track teams. The university's indoor arena, Finneran Pavilion, is home to the school's NCAA Division I 1985, 2016, and 2018 national champion men's basketball teams. In addition to the undergraduate college, Villanova University includes a well-recognized graduate school, a nursing school, a school of continuing studies, numerous certificate programs, and Villanova University Law School.

Schools 
Public school children in Villanova who live in Radnor Township attend Radnor Elementary School in Radnor, Radnor Middle School in Wayne, and Radnor High School in St. Davids, all part of the Radnor Township School District. Children who live in the Lower Merion Township portion of Villanova attend Gladwyne Elementary School in Gladwyne, Welsh Valley Middle School in Narberth, and Harriton High School in Rosemont.

Other private schools in the area include the all-boys Haverford School, located in nearby Haverford and the Episcopal Academy called among locals as "EA" in Newtown Square. There are several all-girls schools in Bryn Mawr, including the Baldwin School, the Agnes Irwin School, the Country Day School of the Sacred Heart, and the Academy of Notre Dame de Namur, as well as the coeducational Shipley School. Rosemont School of the Holy Child on Montgomery Avenue is a nearby Catholic grade school.

Infrastructure

Hospitals 
Bryn Mawr Hospital, at South Bryn Mawr Avenue and Haverford Road, is one of the three nationally ranked community teaching hospitals that serve the Main Line; it is located less than one mile (1.6 km) from the Villanova district line. The hospital has historically been associated with Philadelphia's Jefferson Medical College for many years. Bryn Mawr Hospital is the chief beneficiary of the area's preeminent social and sporting event, the Devon Horse Show and Country Fair, which is held annually during the last week of May at the fairgrounds in Devon.

Notable people 
 Kevin Brennan – stand-up comedian and writer
 Neal Brennan – comedian, writer, director, producer, actor
Colby Cohen (born 1989) – ice hockey player
Fran Dunphy – Temple University men's basketball coach
Julius Erving (Dr. J) – former NBA star
Albert Eugene Gallatin (1881-1952) – artist and art collector
Jim Gardner - television news anchor
Jon Ritchie - former NFL fullback and co-host of the 94.1 WIP Morning Show 
Conyers Read – historian 
Michael Smerconish – broadcaster, journalist, author
Will Smith – actor
Brian Westbrook – former NFL running back
Jay Wright – former head coach of the Villanova Wildcats men's basketball team

Points of interest
 Villanova University
 Appleford/Parsons-Banks Arboretum
 Arboretum Villanova
 Friends of the Willows Cottage
 Stoneleigh: A Natural Garden

References

Philadelphia Main Line
Lower Merion Township, Pennsylvania
Radnor Township, Delaware County, Pennsylvania
Unincorporated communities in Delaware County, Pennsylvania
Unincorporated communities in Montgomery County, Pennsylvania
Unincorporated communities in Pennsylvania